Murder at the Vanities  is a 1934 American Pre-Code musical film based on the 1933 Broadway show with music by Victor Young. It was released by Paramount Pictures. It was directed by Mitchell Leisen, stars Victor McLaglen, Carl Brisson, Jack Oakie, Kitty Carlisle, Gertrude Michael, Toby Wing, and Jessie Ralph. Duke Ellington and His Orchestra are featured in the elaborate "Ebony Rhapsody" number.

The film is primarily a musical, based on Earl Carroll's long-running Broadway revue Earl Carroll's Vanities, combined with a murder mystery. Songs featured in the film by Arthur Johnston and Sam Coslow include "Cocktails for Two" sung by Brisson, "Sweet Marijuana" sung by Michael, "Where Do They Come From (and Where Do They Go)" sung by Carlisle, and "Ebony Rhapsody" performed by Duke Ellington and His Orchestra and sung by Michael. In the film, Lucille Ball, Ann Sheridan, and Virginia Davis had small roles as chorines. It was released on DVD (as part of a six-disc set entitled "Pre-Code Hollywood Collection") on April 7, 2009.

Plot
Jack Ellery (Oakie) is staging a lavish musical revue, starring Eric Lander (Brisson), Ann Ware (Carlisle), and Rita Ross (Michael), supported by a cast of a hundred background singers/dancers (almost all women, and many scantily clad) and two full orchestras. On opening night, just before the show, somebody tries to kill Ware several times. Ellery calls in police lieutenant Murdock (McLaglen) of the homicide squad to investigate. During the show a private detective and then Rita are murdered. Ellery hides this from the rest of the performers, claiming the victims are just sick, and talks Murdock into investigating while the revue continues on, otherwise Ellery will go broke.

Several twists and turns follow, but finally the murders are solved just after the show ends. In the last scene, Nancy (Wing), a squeaky pretty blonde showgirl, finally gets to tell Ellery and Murdock what she has attempted to tell Ellery several times throughout the show. However, he kept putting her off, she was just trying to gain his attention, and he was too busy staging the show. She actually had a vital piece of information that would have solved the first murder much sooner, and might have prevented the second murder. Now that the show is over and a success, Ellery's attention is finally on her, and they go out for the night to celebrate. She giggles once again and moves off stage left in front of him, and then Oakie breaks the fourth wall just momentarily, looking into the camera with a devilish grin, before he follows her.

Cast
 Carl Brisson as Eric Lander
 Victor McLaglen as Bill Murdock 
 Jack Oakie as Jack Ellery  
 Kitty Carlisle as Ann Ware 
 Dorothy Stickney as Norma Watson
 Gertrude Michael as Rita Ross
 Jessie Ralph as Mrs. Helene Smith 
 Charles B. Middleton as Homer Boothby
 Gail Patrick as Sadie Evans
 Donald Meek as Dr. Saunders
 Toby Wing as Nancy
 Duke Ellington as himself

Production

Reception
The film was a box office disappointment for Paramount.

Pre-Code era scenes

References

External links
 
 
 

 ibdb.com/broadway-production/murder-at-the-vanities-11753

1934 films
American black-and-white films
Films directed by Mitchell Leisen
1934 musical films
American musical films
1930s American films